The 1995–96 CIS Insurance Rugby Union County Championship was the 96th edition of England's County Championship rugby union club competition. 

Gloucestershire won their 16th title after defeating Warwickshire in the final.

Final

See also
 English rugby union system
 Rugby union in England

References

Rugby Union County Championship
County Championship (rugby union) seasons